Foramen cecum or foramen caecum (from the Latin caecus meaning blind) can refer to:
 Foramen cecum (frontal bone)
 Foramen cecum (tongue)
 Foramen cecum (dental)